The Goffertstadion, formerly known as McDOS Goffertstadion  for sponsorship reasons, is a football stadium in Nijmegen, Netherlands, located in the Goffertpark. It is home to football club NEC. The stadium was opened on 8 July 1939 by Prince Bernhard of the Netherlands.

Since 1951 the opening of the International Four Days Marches Nijmegen, the so-called Vlaggenparade, a parade with the national flags of all participants is held in the stadium.

NEC Nijmegen are the tenants of the 12,470 capacity venue.

On 19 October 1983 NEC played a UEFA Cup Winners' Cup match against FC Barcelona, still seen as the most important match ever played in the Goffert stadium.

It was rebuilt into a modern stadium with all seats covered and heated and updated catering facilities. The first home-match in the new stadium took place in September 1999. The grand re-opening was on 25 January 2000.

One of the many advantages the renovated stadium offers is the improved atmosphere because the spectators are now situated much closer to the playing ground. Because of this the players have a better interaction with the crowd.

The playing ground and the rest of the stadium are separated from each other by a promenade which is situated under the spectators’ seats. This promenade has a double function: It prevents supporters from entering the playing ground while at the same time containing food and beverage outlets as well as toilets.

A specially constructed space under the playing ground can store heat to warm up the playing ground, so that matches can still take place during winter.

In November 2007 the board of NEC and the city of Nijmegen presented new plans for De Goffert. The capacity is intended to be increased to 20,000 and the stadium will be placed largely underground inside a large hill. This hill will also serve as a home for basketball (Matrixx Magixx), judo and other sports, creating a 'House of Topsports'. The strange, but innovative, design is needed because the city will not allow the stadium to grow in height because of the Goffert Park, which is a protected nature-site.

The Nijmegen venue hosted three international matches of the Netherands national football team in the 1970s, with the last being a qualifying match for Euro 1980 on 20 September 1978 against Iceland: 3–0. The goals were scored by Ruud Krol, Ernie Brandts and Rob Rensenbrink (penalty). On 6 September 2006, it hosted a "home" game of the Israel national football team against Andorra.

Part of the stadium collapsed during a match against Vitesse on 17 October 2021. Nobody was seriously injured.

References
  VoetbalStats

NEC Nijmegen
Goffert
Sports venues completed in 1939
Sports venues in Gelderland
Buildings and structures in Nijmegen
Sport in Nijmegen
1939 establishments in the Netherlands
20th-century architecture in the Netherlands